Târgu Mureș Transilvania Airport  is an international airport located  southwest of Târgu Mureș, Mureș County, in central Romania. Until May 2006, the official name was Târgu Mureș Vidrasău Airport (for the village  outside of Târgu Mureș where it is located).

History
Opened in 1936, Târgu Mureș's first airport was built 2.5 kilometers away from the city centre. The airport was rebuilt in its current location in the 1960s, and inaugurated in 1969. The old location continues to serve recreational aviation, under the name "Aeroportul Sportiv Elie Carafoli" and ICAO code LRMS.

After 2000, the airport has undergone extensive renovation. In October 2005 a new international terminal was opened and Category II instrument landing system was installed, allowing the handling of flights 24 hours a day.

In December 2016, the county council administrator started a new modernization program. The project involved the refurbishment of the runway and the apron (an estimated RON77 million investment). The auction was won by the Porr-Geiger Association, while construction began in early October 2017 and ended in June 2018. On 25 June 2018, the new runway went into operation.

Airlines and destinations
The following airlines operate regular scheduled and charter flights at Târgu Mureș Airport:

Statistics

See also
 List of the busiest airports in Romania
 List of airports in Romania
 Aviation in Romania
 Transport in Romania

References

External links

 Official website
 Google Maps - Aerial View
 

Târgu Mureș
Airport, Targu Mures
Airports in Romania
Airports established in 1969
1969 establishments in Romania